Bagli may refer to:

 Bagli, a town in Dewas district, Madhya Pradesh, India
 Bagli Tehsil, the administrative division of Dewas district encompassing the town
 Bagli (Vidhan Sabha constituency), the legislative assembly constituency of Madhya Pradesh containing the town
 Bagli Party or Bagler, a political faction during the Norwegian Civil Wars
 Bağlı, Osmangazi, a village in Turkey
 Bağlı, Yenice